The World Figure Skating Championships is an annual figure skating competition sanctioned by the International Skating Union in which figure skaters compete for the title of World Champion.

The competition took place on February 10 to 11th in Davos, Switzerland. Only two competitors participated one from Austria and one from Sweden. This time there was an Austrian but no Swedish judge.

Results

Men

Judges:
 Mr. A. L. Dinn 
 Mr. Ludwig Fänner 
 Mr. Admiral Schiess 
 Mr. H. Günther 
 Mr. C. Steffens

Sources
 Result List provided by the ISU

World Figure Skating Championships
World Figure Skating Championships, 1900
1900 in Swiss sport
International figure skating competitions hosted by Switzerland
Sport in Davos
February 1900 sports events